Rajasekhara may refer to:

 Rama Rajasekhara/Cheraman Perumal "Nayanar" (fl. 9th century), theologian, devotional poet and ruler from south India
 Rajashekhara (Sanskrit poet) (fl. 10th century), Sanskrit poet, dramatist and critic
 Y. S. Rajasekhara Reddy (1949–2009), known as YSR, Indian politician

See also
 Rajasekhar (disambiguation)
 S. Rajasekharan (born 1946), Indian literary critic and poet